"If Looks Could Kill" is a song by Destroy Lonely. It was released on March 3, 2023. The song is a single on Lonely's upcoming studio album of the same name.

Background
An early version of the single leaked online and began gaining traction on the social media platform TikTok receiving over 200,000 streams and 75,000,000 views on the platform prior to its official release. On March 3, 2023, he officially released the single and performed it live the same night single during his Rolling Loud set.

Charts

References

2023 songs
2023 singles
Interscope Records singles
Trap music songs